Jamie Lee Peter Turley (born 7 April 1990) is a former English professional footballer who played as a defender.

Career
Turley began his career as a trainee with Wycombe Wanderers but he did not play a competitive match for them and in July 2009 he joined Salisbury City.

In June 2011, he joined Forest Green Rovers. He made his debut for Forest Green on 16 August 2011 in a 1–1 away draw against Luton Town. On his second appearance for the club, against Alfreton Town, he scored his first goal for Forest Green in a 6–1 away win. In April 2014, it was announced that he had left the club after a spell lasting three seasons.

In September 2014, after a spell training with Bristol Rovers, he joined Eastleigh.

In July 2016, Turley joined League Two club Newport County on a two-year contract. Turley made his football league debut for Newport County in a 3–2 defeat to Mansfield Town in League Two on 6 August. He scored his first goal for Newport in the League Two match against Leyton Orient on 13 August.

On 2 August 2017, Turley joined Boreham Wood on loan for the 2017–18 season. He was released by Newport at the end of the 2017–18 season.

On 14 September 2018, Turley signed for Notts County.

On 16 January 2019 Turley signed for Leyton Orient for the remainder of the season He was released at the end of the 2020-21 season.

Turley signed for Barnet in July 2021.

In July 2022, Turley was forced to retire from professional football due to injury.

International
In the 2012–13 season, Turley captained the England C team to semi-final of the International Challenge Trophy, losing the semi-final 1–0 to Turkey. In February 2013, he was selected as England 'C' Player of the Year.

Career statistics

Club

Honours

Club
Leyton Orient
National League: 2018–19
FA Trophy runner-up: 2018–19

References

External links

Living people
1990 births
English footballers
English Football League players
National League (English football) players
Association football defenders
Wycombe Wanderers F.C. players
Salisbury City F.C. players
Forest Green Rovers F.C. players
Eastleigh F.C. players
Newport County A.F.C. players
Boreham Wood F.C. players
Notts County F.C. players
Leyton Orient F.C. players
Barnet F.C. players
England semi-pro international footballers